mengluni is an album by Pamyua released in 1998 by Ellavut Records.

mengluni was the debut album by Pamyua.  The title is the Yupik word for "the beginning."

Track listing
 "Uivaaranga"
 "Kaaka-ggug Cauyalriitqaa"
 "Reindeer Herding Song"
 "My People"
 "Tarvarnauramken"
 "Inngerneq"
 "Cauyaqa Nauwa?"
 "Lullaby"
 "Imumirpak"
 "Unugaanga"

External links
Review by the Anchorage Daily News

1998 albums
Music of Alaska